María Isabel Lineros Rodríguez (born 2 April 1964), better known by her stage name Lucía, is a Spanish singer. 

Lucía was born in Seville, Andalusia.  She is best known for representing Spain at the Eurovision Song Contest 1982 in Harrogate, England, with the song "Él". She finished 10th out of 18 entries.

She has also worked as a radio and TV presenter in Seville, and she participated at the reality show contest La Granja de los Famosos (Spanish version of The Farm) in 2005.

References

External links 

Spanish women singers
Eurovision Song Contest entrants for Spain
Eurovision Song Contest entrants of 1982
People from Seville
1964 births
Living people